Barbara Stracey-Minshall (born 6 November 1953) is a Canadian equestrian. She competed in the individual dressage event at the 1976 Summer Olympics.

References

1953 births
Living people
Canadian female equestrians
Canadian dressage riders
Olympic equestrians of Canada
Equestrians at the 1976 Summer Olympics
Equestrians at the 1975 Pan American Games
Pan American Games silver medalists for Canada
Pan American Games medalists in equestrian
Sportspeople from Montreal
Medalists at the 1975 Pan American Games
20th-century Canadian women
21st-century Canadian women